Junior Pelesasa (born 17 October 1980 in New Zealand) is an Australian rugby union footballer who currently plays for Agen. He plays as a centre.

Career
Pelesasa moved to Australia from New Zealand at the age of 16. He has represented Australia Schoolboys, Australia Under 21s and Australia A. He spent two years playing for the Brisbane Broncos rugby league team after which he left Rugby league and joined Rugby Union playing for the Queensland provincial side before being drafted into the Queensland Reds Super 12 side where he played 33 matches for them. In 2006 he moved to a new Super Rugby franchise known as the Western Force. He played 5 matches for his new team during the 2006 season in which they finished last in the 2006 Super 14 competition.

References

External links
Western Force profile

1980 births
Australian rugby union players
Australian sportspeople of Samoan descent
Queensland Reds players
Western Force players
Rugby union centres
Living people
People educated at Onehunga High School
Rugby union players from Dunedin